A bully pulpit is a conspicuous position that provides an opportunity to speak out and be listened to.
This term was coined by United States President Theodore Roosevelt, who referred to his office as a "bully pulpit", by which he meant a terrific platform from which to advocate an agenda. Roosevelt used the word bully as an adjective meaning "superb" or "wonderful", a more common usage at that time.

References

External links

 

Presidency of Theodore Roosevelt